Evolutionary rescue is a process by which a population—that would have gone extinct in the absence of evolution—persists due to  natural selection acting on heritable variation. The term was first used in 1995 by Gomulkiewicz and Holt  in the context of a sudden environmental change, but the process was studied long before in the context of continuous environmental change and, especially, drug resistance evolution.

Theoretical framework 

After a sudden change in the environment, evolutionary rescue is predicted to create a U-shaped curve of population dynamics, as the original genotypes, which are unable to replace themselves, are replaced by genotypes that are able to increase in numbers. In a continuously changing environment, evolutionary rescue is predicted to appear as a stable lag of the mean trait value behind a moving environmental optimum, where the rate of evolution and rate of change in the environment are equal. The theory has been reviewed by Alexander et al in 2014  and continues to grow rapidly, adding both genetic and ecological complexity.

Evolutionary rescue is distinct from demographic rescue, where a population is sustained by continuous migration from elsewhere, without the need for evolution. On the other hand, genetic rescue, where a population persists because of migration that reduces inbreeding depression, can be thought of a special case of evolutionary rescue (but see ).

Empirical evidence 

Evolutionary rescue has been demonstrated in many different experimental evolution studies, such as yeast evolving to tolerate previously lethal salt concentrations.
There are also a large number of examples of evolutionary rescue in the wild, in the forms of drug resistance, herbicide resistance, other types of pesticide resistance, and genetic rescue.

References

Evolutionary ecology
Evolutionary biology